This is a timeline of Indian history, comprising important legal and territorial changes and political events in India and its predecessor states. To read about the background to these events, see History of India.  See also the list of governors-general of India, list of prime ministers of India and Years in India.


Pre-90th century BCE

90th–50th century BCE

50th–40th century BCE

30th century BCE-20th century BCE

19th century BCE

18th century BCE

17th century BCE

16th century BCE

15th century BCE

14th century BCE

13th century BCE

12th century BCE

11th century BCE

10th century BCE

9th century BCE

8th century BCE

7th century BCE

6th century BCE

5th century BCE

4th century BCE

3rd century BCE

2nd century BCE

1st century BCE

1st century

2nd century

3rd century

4th century

5th century

6th century

7th century

8th century

9th century

10th century

11th century

12th century

13th century

14th century

15th century

16th century

17th century

18th century

19th century

20th century

21st century

See also 
 Chronology of Tamil history
 Hindu units of time
 Sikh gurus (1469–1666)
 Tamil units of measurement
 Timeline of Ahmedabad
 Timeline of Ayyavazhi history
 History of Hinduism
 Timeline of Buddhism (563 BCE – present)
 Timeline of Jainism
 Timeline of Mumbai

References

Bibliography

External links 
 BBC India Timeline

Indian history timelines
India
History of Pakistan